Almafuerte is a village and municipality in Misiones Province in north-eastern Argentina.
The village is located in the Leandro N. Alem department, and borders Leandro N. ALem, Caá Yarí, Olegario Víctor Andrade and Bonpland municipalities. It has a population of 1022 inhabitants (2001 census).

References

See also
List of cities in Argentina

Populated places in Misiones Province